is a Japanese science fiction writer whose career began in 1986. His most famous work is Venus City(1992). In 1993, he won the Seiun Award for Japanese novel. He also won the 1993 Nihon SF Taisho Award.

Bibliography

Evil Eyes (1988)
Ichiban Ue no Oniichan (1989)
Venus City (1992)
Tekusuto no Chiseigaku (1994)
Shadow Orchid (2002)

References

External links

Entry in The Encyclopedia of Science Fiction

1957 births
Japanese science fiction writers
People from Kanagawa Prefecture
Living people